Acer Aspire One is a line of netbooks first released in July 2008 by Acer Inc.

Many characteristics of a particular model of Acer Aspire One are dictated by the CPU platform chosen.  Initial models were based on the Intel Atoms.  Later, models with various AMD chips were introduced.  Newer versions of the Atom were adopted as well.

Early versions were based on the Intel Atom platform, which consists of the Intel Atom processor, Intel 945GSE Express chipset and Intel 82801GBM (ICH7M) I/O controller, and is available in several shell colors: seashell white, sapphire blue, golden brown, onyx black, and coral pink.

Higher end models were released in June 2010 consisting of the AMD Athlon II Neo processor and ATI Radeon HD 4225 graphics controller. These are available in onyx black, antique brass, or mesh black shells depending on model.  Also released was a version of the Aspire One 521 with an AMD-V105 processor running at 1.2 GHz, an ATI Radeon 4225 graphics controller, and equipped with a HDMI port.

A range of later models were powered by AMD Brazos APUs (combined CPU/GPU chips).  The AMD chips had much more powerful video capabilities but consumed more power.

Its main competitor in the low-cost netbook market was the Asus Eee PC line.

In January 2013, Acer officially ended production of their Aspire One series due to declining sales as a result of consumers favoring tablets and Ultrabooks over netbooks.

History

The line was originally manufactured for Acer Inc. by Quanta Computer.; Quanta was phased out as a supplier to Acer, and production of the Acer Aspire One line shifted to other manufacturers in 2009. Also starting in 2009, eSobi Inc. partnered with Acer to preload the eSobi News Center on Acer Aspire One netbooks beginning in the first quarter of 2009.

Operating systems

Windows

Windows XP Home Edition SP3 is installed on the models with a name ending in X, or ending in B followed by another letter denoting color.

It is also possible to install and run Windows Vista or Windows 7 on the earlier model laptop. In high-end versions appearing during 2009, Windows Vista is pre-installed. The lack of a DVD-ROM drive requires creating a bootable USB flash drive (the on-board card reader slots are not bootable) using a USB external DVD drive or PXE boot network install.

Windows 7 Starter is installed by default on models with a name starting in D such as D255E and D257 as well as other later Aspire models.

Linux

Models with names starting in L, or ending in A followed by a letter for color, are shipped with Linpus Linux Lite, which is based on Fedora 8.  This offers a simplified user interface, with default applications like the Firefox 2 browser, OpenOffice.org 2.3, Acer One Mail and Acer One Messenger available directly on the main screen. The default desktop environment has been designed to hide advanced features from the user and to prevent modification. It is possible to modify the system to present a more traditional Xfce 4 desktop, enable more advanced features such as context menus, or install additional software.

It is possible to install and run other Linux distributions on the Acer Aspire One, and some specially customised Linux distributions have been designed to offer out-of-the-box functionality. These include:
Joli OS
Ubuntu Netbook Edition (UNE)
Linux4One
Kuki Linux
ArchOne
Moblin
Slitaz
Other distributions of the Linux operating system will also run, such as :
Arch Linux
Fedora
CentOS
Debian
CrunchBang
BunsenLab
antiX
Mandriva Linux
Ubuntu, Ubuntu Studio
Eeebuntu
openSUSE
Slackware
Linux Mint
PCLinuxOS
 MeeGo
 Puppy Linux
 Peppermint Linux
 Lubuntu - which also features a netbook specific desktop environment.
 Xubuntu
 Parrot Security OS
 MX Linux

Mac OS X

Through the OSx86 project, an Aspire One can boot and run a modified version of Mac OS X, including iAtkos, iDeneb, "XxX" and Kalyway distributions. This procedure is not supported by Apple or Acer.

FreeBSD

FreeBSD v. 8.2 is known to run on the Acer Aspire One, although some limitations apply: lid close not starting a hibernate, and power management which works to a very limited degree.

OpenBSD

OpenBSD releases ranging from 4.4 to 6.4 are known to run on some of the many models of Aspire One, with some limitations based on BIOS and other variations.

Android

Some models are dual boot (e.g. D250, D260), with Android 1.6 and Windows 7 Starter.  The computer boots up into Android first, with a tab to select Windows.  The Android-x86 OS has limited apps available to it.

FreeDOS

It is possible to install FreeDOS on even the earliest models. Some peripherals, like a USB mouse or Ethernet port, will not be detected by the standard setup and may require manual tweaking.

Storage

Solid state drives

The A110 model ships with an 8 GB or 16 GB solid-state drive (SSD), although some models do not come with one. Early 8 GB models come with the Intel Z-P230, model SSDPAMM0008G1. This SSD has been criticized for its slow read and write speed. Intel lists the drive's maximum speeds as 38 MB/s read and 10 MB/s write. Later models come with the slightly faster Samsung P-SSD 1800.

Hard disks

The hard disk is a regular 2.5-in 5400 rpm SATA drive with 80, 120, 160, 250, 320, 500 or 750 GB. A number of different drives from different manufacturers have been reported to be included. Newer-model Aspire Ones take a 7 mm thick drive, as opposed to the usual 9.5 mm thickness that makes up most 2.5-inch form factor hard drives and SSDs.

Expansion slot

There is also an SD/SDHC storage expansion slot on all models for additional storage (the 533 model does not support SDHC as verified by Acer support UK).  On Linux versions this automatically expands the space of the SSD or HDD using aufs.  Windows XP models treat it as a normal removable drive.

Some models have a second slot that functions as a standard multi-in-1 flash memory card reader.  The 110 BIOS does not allow one to boot an operating system from this slot, but the 150 BIOS is capable of booting from an SDHC card in the slot.  (Note: with Linux, it is possible essentially to boot from HD or USB by using a /boot partition on the regular boot device and an initrd that loads the real OS from the slot).

Power management

The Intel Atom platform has a specified maximum TDP of 11.8 W. Individual figures are 2.5 W for the N270 processor, 6 W for the 945GSE chipset and 3.3 W for the 82801GBM I/O controller.  The AUO B089AW01 LCD panel is rated at a maximum power consumption of 3 W.  Typical read–write power consumption for the SSD is around 0.3 W, and 0.01 W when idle. The different HDDs are rated at about 1.5–2.5 W for read–write operations and around 0.7 W when idle.

The official ratings for the battery are up to 3 hours for the three cell, and up to 8 hours for the six cell.  Linpus Linux Lite has been optimized by Acer for lower power consumption. Battery life is shorter on HDD configurations with Windows XP, at approximately 2.5 hours for the three cell.  Although the standard three cell battery is 2.2 Ah, some users have reported 2.4 Ah and 2.9 Ah batteries from the factory.  Various suppliers online now carry aftermarket batteries, including the six cell. Aftermarket nine cell batteries are available though they are quite heavy, and also protrude out of the back, reducing the aesthetics but improving airflow.

Specifications

An Acer AOD model (10.1" screen) product comparison guide, in the form of a spreadsheet file download, is available from increa.com.

Additional hardware

Since November 2008 the 3G-enabled model Aspire One A150X-3G is available in Europe, while models with 3G modems began shipping in the United Kingdom in December of the same year and were denoted by the letter G in their model number. The first generation Aspire One webcam is an Acer Labs International M5608 camera controller with attached 0.3 MP SuYin or 1.3 MP LiteOn CMOS sensor.

Some models of the Aspire One use an Intel 945GSE chipset which only supports 2 GB of RAM. Installing memory modules larger than 2 GB has caused the Aspire to fail the power-on self-test.  Model 522, featuring the AMD Fusion C-50 chip, has been reported to work with 4 GB installed (although the included Windows 7 Starter edition has an artificially imposed 2 GB limit).

AO751h (751h)

The AO751h has the larger 11.6" screen with an LED backlit display and a 1366x768 native resolution. It includes a 1 GB/667 MHz DDR2 533 MHz SDRAM memory option (2 GB being the maximum), a 160 GB HDD option, Bluetooth option, Intel northbridge US15W, and an OS option for Windows Vista Home Basic edition or Windows XP Media Center Edition. All AO751h units are powered by an Intel Atom Z520 processor running at 1330 MHz (or 1240 MHz in first version). The US15W system controller incorporates a GMA500 video core. The AO751h has a dual power (AC/DC) option. The six cell battery provides the working time of about 8 hours. Besides the mentioned specifications of the AO751h it supports 10/100 Mbit/s Ethernet interface, 802.11g Wi-Fi card Atheros, Bluetooth 2.1, standard VGA-out jack, 3 USB 2.0 ports, a Memory Card reader 5:1 (xD-Picture Card, SD card), as well as Microphone In jack 3.5 mm (1/8" Mini), Headphone Out jack 3.5 mm (1/8" Mini). One of the cons is the relatively small TouchPad and mouse buttons. Large and comfortable keyboard is one of the distinguishing features of the device.

There have been reports of some AO751h units randomly freezing, which has led to recalls in Denmark.  Some users have reported that having their motherboards replaced by Acer solved the problem and Acer officially reporting that the fix is to install an updated BIOS.

AOA150 speaker vibration and other issues
The 8.9" models have an improperly designed speaker location that causes vibration to the internal hard drive, causing it to be problematic. The right speaker is especially prone to this. Audio frequencies around 1 kHz cause the hard drive to almost stop responding. Full volume MP3/audio playback easily causes these models to run extremely slowly, or crash because of unresponsive disk I/O. This problem also causes bad sectors, crashed hard drives and corrupt Windows partitions in the long term. Even sound from an external speaker with 1 kHz tone test causes this hard drive behaviour. SSD drives do not suffer from this problem. Workarounds identified are: listening to music at a lower volume, using only the left speaker, using a software equalizer to tone down the 1 kHz frequency, replacing the hard drive with an SSD, and trying to install soft sound dampening material around the speakers and the hard drive.

Aspire One Happy

The Acer Aspire One Happy is a 10.1 inch netbook with different operating systems: (Android 2.1 and Windows 7). It was launched by Acer Inc. in November 2010. The computer is nearly identical to the Acer Aspire One D255. The main difference is that the Happy case comes in several different color options (comes in Candy pink, Lavender purple, Lime green and Hawaii blue). It is powered by Intel Atom N450 or dual-core Intel Atom N550, with up to 2 GB RAM and Intel Graphics Media Accelerator 3150. There is also a 3G version for proper portability, with each model measuring 24 mm thick and weighing 1.25 kg with a six-cell battery pack.

In mid–2011, the "Acer Aspire One Happy 2" line was released. This model may have bluetooth on board.  It seems that some countries ship this newer model with bluetooth while others do not.
This seems to depend which wireless card they shipped with, some can in fact be replaced as the BIOS should not be card specific.
The functionality uses an internal USB bus on miniPCIe slot specification but not all have these pins connected.
A good way to check is find a miniPCIe to USB3 card and see if the device is recognized or not.

Acer Aspire One D270

The Acer Aspire One D270 netbook is the first 10-inch Acer netbook to feature a 1.6 GHz Intel Atom N2600 dual core processor and running Windows 7 Starter 32-bit. The AOD270-1186, the white models, feature an Intel Atom N2600 dual core processor with 1 MB L2 cache, 1.6 GHz processor and Hyper Threading technology. The AOD270-1410, the black model, features a 10.1 inch WSVGA LED-backlit display with CrystalBrite technology with a 17:10 aspect ratio and 1024 x 600 resolution display, 1 GB DDR3 SDRAM memory, a 320 GB 5400 rpm hard drive and integrated Intel GMA 3600 graphics with 64 MB dedicated memory.

In Europe, the Acer Aspire One D270-26Ckk NU.SGAED.011 is running Linpus Linux and comes in an "espresso black" color. It also includes 2 GB of RAM, and a 320 GB hard drive. With Linux, this netbook becomes a bit faster than its Windows 7 counterpart.

Although Intel specifies the maximum RAM capability of the N2600 as 2 GB, numerous users have reported a 4 GB SODIMM works well in the D270, with 2.99 GB reported usable by Windows 7 Home Premium 32 bit (after upgrading from Starter).

Some models of the Acer Aspire One D270 have Windows 7 Home Basic pre-installed and have an Intel Atom N2800 1.86 GHz processor.

Some more recent AOA's can be upgraded to 4 GB 1.5V RAM if they use DDR3 and the 64 bit CPU; though this is not a recommended upgrade path it  works on the D270 -26Dbb and the modification was medium term stable on the test machine running x64 Windows 7 Home using SDR#. It is believed that many other inexpensive VT64x equipped DDR3 netbooks have the same capability but disabled for licensing reasons or due to the clock circuitry being unable to handle certain modules correctly resulting in system instability, that can be overcome using spdtool and slightly altering timing parameters.

There are known issues with the WiFi in the D270 over time, which sometimes occur after the card is changed. Putting the OEM one back in does not resolve this problem and symptoms include the Fn + F3 not working. Further investigation suggests that the issue may be BIOS corruption and replacing or reflashing the chip may well resolve it but as of yet this is untested. The D270 is known to have SPECTRE/Meltdown vulnerabilities but this may be patched at a later date with a third party BIOS.

Reception

CNET editors' review has been positive, although held reservations as the Aspire One is early to market and many netbooks are planned for the near future.

A The Tech Report (Techreport.com) review of the 751h, and the similar Gateway LT3103U, was generally positive, praising the notebooks' battery life but criticizing the large number of third party software products preinstalled and running by default on the computers.

See also
 Gateway netbooks
 Comparison of netbooks

References

External links
 

Computer-related introductions in 2008
Linux-based devices
Netbooks
Android (operating system) devices
Acer Inc. laptops